Beloslava Krasteva (born 2004) is a Bulgarian chess player who holds the title of FIDE Master (FM, 2019). She won Bulgarian Women's Chess Championship (2020).

Biography 
In 2019 Beloslava Krasteva won Bulgarian Girls Chess Championships winner in G16 age group. She played for Bulgaria in European Youth Chess Championships and World Youth Chess Championships. 

In 2019 Beloslava Krasteva ranked 3rd in Bulgarian Women's Chess Championship. A year later in Sofia Beloslava Krasteva won this tournament.

Beloslava Krasteva played for Bulgaria in the Women's Chess Olympiad:
 In 2022, at third board in the 44th Chess Olympiad (women) in Chennai (+6, =1, -3).

In 2019, she was awarded the FIDE Master (FM) title.

References

External links 

2004 births
Living people
Chess FIDE Masters
Bulgarian female chess players